Bitter Feast is a 2010 American psychological horror film directed and written by Joe Maggio. It stars James LeGros as a chef pushed over the edge by food critic J.T. Franks' (Joshua Leonard) vicious review. The film also features actors Larry Fessenden, Megan Hilty, and a cameo from real life master chef Mario Batali.

Premise
Peter Grey is a successful New York chef, disgruntled by caustic reviews from the food critic J.T. Franks. After Franks' bad review, Grey is fired by his boss Gordon. He kidnaps Franks, takes him to a cabin in the woods, and forces him to cook his own "perfect dinner".

Cast

Production
Bitter Feast was directed by  Joe Maggio, and it stars James LeGros and Joshua Leonard. The film was shot in New York City and Woodstock. Larry Fessenden produced the film with his company Glass Eye Pix.

Release
The film premiered as part of the Los Angeles Film Festival on June 18, 2010.  The DVD was released in October 26, 2010.

Reception
Rotten Tomatoes, a review aggregator, reports that 57% of seven surveyed critics gave the film a positive review; the average rating is 5.2/10.  Paul Brunick of The New York Times wrote, "Beyond its creepy back story, the horror in this morally confused and cinematically inert film is entirely nominal."  Mark Olsen of The Village Voice wrote, "Zesty fun for its actors, Feast is at once a sly parody of the celebrity-chef culture spawned by all the cable cooking shows and competitions, and a creepy little chamber-piece."

References

External links

2010 films
2010s comedy horror films
American black comedy films
American comedy thriller films
American independent films
Glass Eye Pix films
2010 comedy films
2010s English-language films
2010s American films